Ana Milchevska (born 23 August 2003) is a Macedonian footballer who plays as a defender for the North Macedonia national team.

International career
Milchevska made her debut for the North Macedonia national team on 25 November 2021, against Northern Ireland.

References

2003 births
Living people
Women's association football defenders
Macedonian women's footballers
North Macedonia women's international footballers